Muhammet Karavuş (born 10 June 2002) is a Turkish freestyle wrestler competing in the 57 kg division. He is a member of Ankara İlbank Spor Club.

Career 
Muhammet Karavuş won the silver medal in the men's 57 kg event at the 2021 World Junior Wrestling Championships in Russia. Karavuş was a point away from winning the gold but Ramamzan Bagavudinov scripted a win for the ages.

In 2022, he won one of the bronze medals in his event at the Yasar Dogu Tournament held in Istanbul, Turkey. He won the gold medal in the 57 kg event at the 2022 Mediterranean Games held in Oran, Algeria. He competed in the 57kg event at the 2022 World Wrestling Championships held in Belgrade, Serbia.

References

External links
 

Living people
Turkish male sport wrestlers
2002 births
People from Ordu
Competitors at the 2022 Mediterranean Games
Mediterranean Games medalists in wrestling
Mediterranean Games gold medalists for Turkey